Deropristidae is a family of trematodes belonging to the order Plagiorchiida.

Genera:
 Deropristis Odhner, 1902
 Pristicola Cable, 1952
 Skrjabinopsolus Ivanov, 1937

References

Plagiorchiida